James Wilfred Gallimore (born November 28, 1957) is a Canadian retired ice hockey player who played two games in the National Hockey League for the Minnesota North Stars during the 1977–78 season.

Career statistics

Regular season and playoffs

External links
 

1957 births
Living people
Canadian ice hockey left wingers
Fort Wayne Komets players
Fort Worth Texans players
Kamloops Chiefs players
Minnesota North Stars draft picks
Minnesota North Stars players
Oklahoma City Stars players
Ice hockey people from Edmonton
Wichita Wind players